Lačný is a  Slovak surname. Notable people with this surname include:

Ľudovít Lačný (born December 8, 1926) is a Slovak chess problem composer and judge
Miloš Lačný (born 8 March 1988) is a Slovak footballer

See also
Lacny, a chess problem theme named after Ľudovít Lačný
Lačna Gora, Slovenia
Lačen, a Slovenian surname